Charles Jackson Paine (August 26, 1833 – August 12, 1916) was an American railroad executive, soldier, and yachtsman who was a general in the Union Army during the American Civil War.

Biography

Paine was born August 26, 1833, in Boston, Massachusetts, son of Charles Cushing Paine and Fannie Cabot Jackson, and great-grandson of Robert Treat Paine, one of the signers of the United States Declaration of Independence. His brother, Sumner Edward Jackson Paine, was a 2nd Lieutenant in Company A, 20th Regiment Massachusetts Volunteer Infantry and was killed during the repulse of Pickett's Charge on July 3, 1863, at the Battle of Gettysburg.

He graduated from Harvard in 1853 and made a considerable fortune in railroad enterprises. In 1861 he entered the Federal service as a captain in the 22nd Massachusetts Infantry. The next year he was sent to Ship Island, Mississippi. In October, he was commissioned as the first colonel of the 2nd Louisiana Infantry. During the siege of Port Hudson (May 24 – July 8, 1863) he commanded a brigade.  On March 4, 1864, Paine resigned his commission and returned to Massachusetts.

The following July, he again entered the service as a brigadier general. On September 29, Paine led a division of black troops at New Market Heights, located south of Richmond, Virginia. Paine participated in both expeditions against Fort Fisher (December 1864/January 1865), although his troops played only a minor role.  His division was however more actively engaged during the following Battle of Wilmington.  After the war, he served briefly as the district commander at New Berne, and managed to arrange the retrieval of Robert Gould Shaw's captured sword, so that it could be returned to the bereaved family. On January 15, 1866, he was brevetted as a major general of volunteers.

During his later years, Paine took a great interest in yachting. He was the owner of the Puritan, the Mayflower, and the Volunteer, each of which successfully defended the America's Cup against a British challenger.

Paine was one of the oarsmen in the first boat race between Harvard and Yale (August 1852), which was the first inter-collegiate sporting event in North America.  He would be one of the charter members of The Country Club (Brookline, Massachusetts), the prototype of country clubs everywhere, and built one of the first golf courses in North America in Weston, Massachusetts.  He reputedly played with red golf balls, so as to be able to find them in the winter among the snowdrifts. Paine helped finance the founding of Middlesex School (Concord, Massachusetts), of which his son-in-law Frederick Winsor was the founder and first headmaster.  Paine's interest in sports continued into the next generation: two of his sons, John B. and Sumner, won pistol-shooting events at the first modern Olympic Games (Athens 1896).

Paine died at his summer home in Weston, Massachusetts on August 12, 1916. He was buried at Mount Auburn Cemetery.

See also

List of American Civil War generals (Union)
List of Massachusetts generals in the American Civil War
Massachusetts in the American Civil War

References

External links
General Charles J. Paine portrait by John Singer Sargent

People from Boston
Harvard University alumni
Union Army generals
People of Massachusetts in the American Civil War
19th-century American railroad executives
Yachting
America's Cup sailors
1833 births
1916 deaths
Burials at Mount Auburn Cemetery